MBf Tower is a commercial skyscraper within the city of George Town in Penang, Malaysia. Located at Northam Road, the 31-storey building, completed in 1994, is one of the oldest skyscrapers along the coastal street.

History 
Construction of the MBf Tower began in 1990 and was completed by 1994, making it one of the first skyscrapers to be built along Northam Road. The building originally housed the Penang branch of MBf Finance Berhad, which was later acquired by AmBank in 2001.

One of the tallest skyscrapers in Penang, the MBf Tower was built on the site of the demolished Northam Court, a 16-storey luxurious condominium project under construction which was demolished just before completion in 1980 when it began tilting and was at risk of collapse.

See also 
List of tallest buildings in George Town
 Northam Road

References 

Buildings and structures in George Town, Penang
Office buildings in Penang
Skyscraper office buildings in Malaysia
1994 establishments in Malaysia
Office buildings completed in 1994
20th-century architecture in Malaysia